Alexandr Syman (born July 26, 1977 in Kopyl) is a retired Belarusian biathlete.

He competed in the 2002, 2006 and 2010 Winter Olympics for Belarus. His best finish was 8th, as a member of the Belarusian relay team in 2002. His best individual performance was 20th, in the 2010 sprint.

He earned one individual Biathlon World Cup victory, in the sprint event at Pokljuka in 2004/05. His best overall finish in the Biathlon World Cup also came in this season, placing 35th. He also earned a victory with the Belarusian relay team in 2003/04, as well as six other World Cup podiums. He won a silver medal at the Biathlon World Championships with the relay team as well, in 2001. His best individual performance in a World Championships was 21st, in the 2008 individual.

World Cup Podiums

References

External links 
 
 
 

1977 births
Living people
Belarusian male biathletes
Olympic biathletes of Belarus
Biathletes at the 2002 Winter Olympics
Biathletes at the 2006 Winter Olympics
Biathletes at the 2010 Winter Olympics
Biathlon World Championships medalists
Universiade medalists in biathlon
Universiade silver medalists for Belarus
Competitors at the 2005 Winter Universiade
People from Kapyl
Sportspeople from Minsk Region